Delia Carmen Durrer (born 14 November 2002) is a Swiss World Cup alpine ski racer and specializes in the speed events of downhill and super-G. During her brief career, her best World Cup result is thirteenth in a downhill at Lake Louise, Canada.

World Cup results

Season standings

Top twenty finishes
*0 podiums, 2 top twenties

References

External links
 
 

2002 births
Living people
Swiss female alpine skiers
Alpine skiers at the 2020 Winter Youth Olympics
Sportspeople from Nidwalden